The 2018 PDC Unicorn Challenge Tour consisted of 20 darts tournaments on the 2018 PDC Pro Tour.

Prize money
The prize money for the Challenge Tour had a prize fund of £10,000 per event, with the winner of each event receiving £2,000.

This is how the prize money is divided:

January

Challenge Tour 1
Challenge Tour 1 was contested on Saturday 27 January 2018 at the Robin Park Tennis Centre in Wigan.

Challenge Tour 2
Challenge Tour 2 was contested on Saturday 27 January 2018 at the Robin Park Tennis Centre in Wigan.

Challenge Tour 3
Challenge Tour 3 was contested on Sunday 28 January 2018 at the Robin Park Tennis Centre in Wigan.

Challenge Tour 4
Challenge Tour 4 was contested on Sunday 28 January 2018 at the Robin Park Tennis Centre in Wigan.

March

Challenge Tour 5
Challenge Tour 5 was contested on Saturday 24 March 2018 at Arena MK in Milton Keynes.

Challenge Tour 6
Challenge Tour 6 was contested on Saturday 24 March 2018 at Arena MK in Milton Keynes.

Challenge Tour 7
Challenge Tour 7 was contested on Sunday 25 March 2018 at Arena MK in Milton Keynes.

Challenge Tour 8
Challenge Tour 8 was contested on Sunday 25 March 2018 at Arena MK in Milton Keynes.

May

Challenge Tour 9
Challenge Tour 9 was contested on Saturday 5 May 2018 at the Robin Park Tennis Centre in Wigan.

Challenge Tour 10
Challenge Tour 10 was contested on Saturday 5 May 2018 at the Robin Park Tennis Centre in Wigan.

Challenge Tour 11
Challenge Tour 11 was contested on Sunday 6 May 2018 at the Robin Park Tennis Centre in Wigan.

Challenge Tour 12
Challenge Tour 12 was contested on Sunday 6 May 2018 at the Robin Park Tennis Centre in Wigan.

September

Challenge Tour 13
Challenge Tour 13 was contested on Saturday 8 September 2018 at the Robin Park Tennis Centre in Wigan.

Challenge Tour 14
Challenge Tour 14 was contested on Saturday 8 September 2018 at the Robin Park Tennis Centre in Wigan.

Challenge Tour 15
Challenge Tour 15 was contested on Sunday 9 September 2018 at the Robin Park Tennis Centre in Wigan.

Challenge Tour 16
Challenge Tour 16 was contested on Sunday 9 September 2018 at the Robin Park Tennis Centre in Wigan.

November

Challenge Tour 17
Challenge Tour 17 was contested on Saturday 10 November 2018 at the East of England Showground in Peterborough.

Challenge Tour 18
Challenge Tour 18 was contested on Saturday 10 November 2018 at the East of England Showground in Peterborough.

Challenge Tour 19
Challenge Tour 19 was contested on Sunday 11 November 2018 at the East of England Showground in Peterborough.

Challenge Tour 20
Challenge Tour 20 was contested on Sunday 11 November 2018 at the East of England Showground in Peterborough.

References

2018 in darts
2018 PDC Pro Tour